USS N-6 (SS-58) was a N-class coastal defense submarine of the United States Navy.  Her keel was laid down on 15 April 1915 by Lake Torpedo Boat Company in Bridgeport, Connecticut.  The N-boats built by Lake had slightly different specifications from the ones built by Seattle Construction and Drydock and are sometimes considered a separate class.

N-6 was launched on 21 April 1917 sponsored by Mrs. John A. Kissick, and commissioned on 9 July 1918.

Service history
After outfitting at New London, Connecticut, she commenced patrolling off the New England coast to protect coastal shipping from German U-boats. She alternated operating out of New London and New York City until she put into the former port on 13 October for upkeep. With the exception of a training cruise up the New England coast from 14 to 19 July 1919, and a voyage to New York Navy Yard from 29 September to 9 October, N-6 remained at New London until sailing in early May 1920 for Annapolis, Maryland, arriving on 27 May. There, she was used to indoctrinate midshipmen of the United States Naval Academy in submarine warfare.

Departing Annapolis on 3 June, she returned to New London where she was placed in reserve on 7 June. Remaining in reserve until 15 September, she sailed to Philadelphia, Pennsylvania, for an extensive overhaul, returning to New London on 25 March 1921. She operated out of New London, making several training cruises, until October, when her engines were transferred to a new
L-class submarine. Departing New London on 2 February 1922, under tow of tug , she sailed to Philadelphia where she was decommissioned on 16 February and was sold for scrap to Joseph G. Hitner of Philadelphia on 31 July.

References

External links
 

United States N-class submarines
World War I submarines of the United States
Ships built in Bridgeport, Connecticut
1917 ships